Vlado Miloševič (born 4 June 1968) is a retired Slovenian football striker. In 1992, when playing for Ljubljana, he was selected as the Slovenian footballer of the year.

References

External links
 Stats at PrvaLiga 

1968 births
Living people
Footballers from Ljubljana
Yugoslav footballers
Slovenian footballers
Association football forwards
Yugoslav First League players
Slovenian PrvaLiga players
NK Olimpija Ljubljana (1945–2005) players
HNK Rijeka players
NK Ljubljana players
NK Beltinci players
Slovenia international footballers
Slovenian football managers
ND Ilirija 1911 managers